Ozinga is a surname. Notable people with the surname include:

Frank M. Ozinga (1914–1987), American lawyer and politician
Saskia Ozinga (born 1960), Dutch environmentalist and social activist
Tim Ozinga, American politician

See also
Ozinga Field, a baseball field located in Crestwood, Illinois